Ringvassøy Church  is a parish church of the Church of Norway in Karlsøy Municipality in Troms og Finnmark county, Norway. It is located in the village of Hansnes on the island of Ringvassøya. It is the main church for the Karlsøy parish which is part of the Tromsø domprosti (arch-deanery) in the Diocese of Nord-Hålogaland.

History
In 1970, when the administrative centre of Karlsøy Municipality was moved from the small island of Karlsøya to the village of Hansnes (on Ringvassøya island), the discussion began about building a church in Hansnes to be the new main church for the municipality. The white, concrete church building was completed in 1977 and it seats about 400 people. The church has a fan-shaped design. The church was consecrated on 12 June 1977 by the Bishop Kristen Kyrre Bremer.

Media gallery

See also
List of churches in Nord-Hålogaland

References

Karlsøy
Churches in Troms
20th-century Church of Norway church buildings
Churches completed in 1977
1977 establishments in Norway
Concrete churches in Norway
Fan-shaped churches in Norway